Brad Martin (born ) is an English professional rugby league footballer who plays as a  or  forward for the Castleford Tigers in the Betfred Super League.

Background 
Martin was born in Pontefract, West Yorkshire, England.

Martin played junior rugby league for Dewsbury Moor ARLFC.

Martin attended Outwood Grange Academy, Wakefield between 2012 and 2017. Martin was also in the same year as rugby league and Turkey rugby International footballer Yusuf Aydin.

Career

Castleford Tigers
On 22 October 2020, Martin made his Super League début for Castleford Tigers (Heritage № 1003) against Hull Kingston Rovers.

In January 2021, Martin was promoted to Castleford's first team and signed a one-year contract extension. He scored his first try for the Tigers against the Salford Red Devils on 11 July. He made 9 appearances throughout the season and signed a new one-year deal with Castleford in October.

References

External links
Castleford Tigers profile

2001 births
Living people
Castleford Tigers players
Coventry Bears players
English rugby league players
Rugby league players from Pontefract
Rugby league props